Alexandre Pellicier (born 9 December 1981) is a French ski mountaineer.

Pellicier is born in the Tarentaise Valley and lives in Albertville. He started ski mountaineering in 1998 and competed first at Pierra Menta "juniors" race in the same year. He is a member of the Etoile Sportive du Cormet  and has been member of the French national team since 2005.

Selected results 
 2002:
 1st, French Championship "espoirs" single
 2005:
 6th, European Championship team race (together with Cyril Champange)
 2006:
 8th, World Championship team race (together with Pierre Gignoux)
 2007:
 2nd, European Championship team race (together with William Bon Mardion)
 6th, European Championship combination ranking
 7th, European Championship single race
 2008:
 1st, World Championship team race (together with Florent Perrier)
 4th, World Championship combination ranking
 6th (and 5th in the "international men" ranking), Patrouille des Glaciers (together with Tony Sbalbi and Didier Blanc)
 10th, World Championship single race
 2010:
 4th, World Championship team race (together with William Bon Mardion)
 2011:
 5th, World Championship sprint
 5th, World Championship team race (together with Valentin Favre)

Pierra Menta 

 2006: 6th, together with Cyril Champange
 2007: 3rd, together with Bertrand Blanc
 2008: 5th, together with Ola Berger
 2009: 6th, together with Grégory Gachet
 2010: 7th, together with Didier Blanc
 2011: 7th, together with Florent Perrier

External links
 Alexandre Pellicier at skimountaineering.org

References 

1981 births
Living people
French male ski mountaineers
World ski mountaineering champions
Sportspeople from Savoie
21st-century French people
20th-century French people